Fernando Manuel Parada Folha (born 18 January 1958 in Matosinhos) is a retired Portuguese footballer who played as a forward.

External links

1958 births
Living people
Sportspeople from Matosinhos
Portuguese footballers
Association football forwards
Primeira Liga players
Liga Portugal 2 players
Leixões S.C. players
Boavista F.C. players
S.L. Benfica footballers
Varzim S.C. players
S.C. Beira-Mar players
C.D. Trofense players
F.C. Felgueiras players
Portugal under-21 international footballers
Portugal international footballers